Aydarovo is the name of several rural localities in Russia:
Aydarovo, Chuvash Republic, a village in Andreyevo-Bazarskoye Rural Settlement of Kozlovsky District in the Chuvash Republic
Aydarovo, Kaluga Oblast, a village in Iznoskovsky District of Kaluga Oblast
Aydarovo, Pskov Oblast, a village in Loknyansky District of Pskov Oblast
Aydarovo, Tyulyachinsky District, Republic of Tatarstan, a village in Tyulyachinsky District of the Republic of Tatarstan
Aydarovo, Zelenodolsky District, Republic of Tatarstan, a village in Zelenodolsky District of the Republic of Tatarstan
Aydarovo, Tula Oblast, a village in Bunyrevsky Rural Okrug of Aleksinsky District in Tula Oblast
Aydarovo, Voronezh Oblast, a selo in Aydarovskoye Rural Settlement of Ramonsky District in Voronezh Oblast